Thomas Ryan (November 25, 1837 – April 5, 1914) was a nineteenth-century politician and lawyer from Kansas.

Biography
Born in Oxford, New York, Ryan moved to Bradford County, Pennsylvania with his parents, attended Dickinson Seminary in Williamsport, Pennsylvania, studied law and was admitted to the bar in 1861. During the Civil War, he served in the Union Army from 1862 to 1864, moved to Topeka, Kansas in 1865 and served as prosecuting attorney of Shawnee County, Kansas from 1865 to 1873. Ryan was Assistant United States Attorney for Kansas from 1873 to 1877, was elected a Republican to the United States House of Representatives in 1876, serving from 1877 to 1889 and was appointed Ambassador to Mexico by President Benjamin Harrison in 1889, serving until 1893. He was appointed Assistant Secretary of the Interior by President William McKinley in 1897, serving until 1907 when he was sent to Muskogee, Oklahoma as the personal resident representative of the Secretary of the Interior which he served as until his death in Muskogee on April 5, 1914. Ryan was interred in Topeka Cemetery in Topeka, Kansas.

External links
 Retrieved on 2008-02-14

1837 births
1914 deaths
People from Oxford, New York
People from Bradford County, Pennsylvania
Pennsylvania lawyers
People of Pennsylvania in the American Civil War
Union Army soldiers
Politicians from Topeka, Kansas
Kansas lawyers
District attorneys in Kansas
Ambassadors of the United States to Mexico
Politicians from Muskogee, Oklahoma
19th-century American diplomats
Oklahoma Republicans
Republican Party members of the United States House of Representatives from Kansas
19th-century American politicians
19th-century American lawyers
People buried in Topeka Cemetery